Georgina "Piggy" March (née French, born 12 August 1980) is a British equestrian sportswoman who competes in eventing. She won the 2019 Badminton Horse Trials and 2022 Burghley Horse Trials on Vanir Kamira, and finished second at the 2011 Badminton Horse Trials and the 2017 Burghley Horse Trials.  She won Individual silver at the 2009 European Championships and a team gold at the 2018 World Equestrian Games. She earned selection for the 2012 Olympic Games, but was forced to withdraw due to an injury to her horse, DHI Topper W. She was also selected for Tokyo 2020 Olympics, as a reserve; however, her owners did not want the horse to travel, Brookfield Inocent, if it was not to compete.

Early life
French is from North Elmham in Norfolk. She gained her nickname early on when visited by her sisters in hospital who noted a resemblance to Piglet from the Winnie-the-Pooh stories.  Her mother Kate and sister Nini also compete in eventing.

Eventing career
Having competed on smaller events, French's first championship level ride was in 2001 at the young riders European Championship, with a 4th place in the individual and a team gold medal.
French represented Britain as an individual at the 2009 Europeans, winning the individual silver medal aboard Some Day Soon. The following year, she competed at the World Equestrian Games, finishing 14th with Jakata. This combination then finished 9th at the 2011 Europeans, as French won her first senior team medal, team bronze.

In the senior ranks, she has competed at a number of CCI 4* (now 5*) competitions, and won the CCI5*-L Badminton Horse Trials with Vanir Kamira in 2019. Previously her best place at the top level was 2nd with Jakata at Badminton in 2011. Earlier this year (2022) French ran Burghley Horse Trials with her horse, Vanir Kamira and won it. French has also won numerous international 3* events, including

Hartpury CIC3* in 2010 with Jakata

Burnham Market CIC3* in 2011 with DHI Topper W

Bleinhem CIC3* in 2011 with DHI Topper W

Houghton CIC3* in 2012 with Jakata 

Barbury CIC3* in 2013 with Tinka`s Time

Burgham CIC3* in 2014 with Westwood Marinier

Chatsworth CIC3* in 2018 with Quarrycrest Echo

French's top horse, Jakata, was retired at the end of the 2014 season. She had three top horses for the 2015 season: DHI Topper W, Westwood Marinier and Tinka's Time.

CCI 5* Results

International Championship Results

Notable Horses

Flintlock II
2001 Young Rider European Championships - team gold, individual 4th
Some Day Soon
2009 European Championships - individual silver
Jakarta
2010 World Equestrian Games - individual 16th
2011 Badminton CCI5* runner up
2011 European Championships - team bronze, individual 9th
Quarryquest Echo
2018 World Equestrian Games - team gold, individual 10th
2019 European Championships - team silver, individual 15th
Vanir Kamira
2017 & 19 Burghley CCI5* runner up
2019 Badminton CCI5* winner
2021 Bicton CCI5* third place
Brookfield Inocent
2020 Pau CCI5* runner up
2021 European Championships - team gold, individual silver

References

External links

British event riders
1980 births
Living people
Sportspeople from Norfolk
British female equestrians
People from North Elmham